Singapore competed at the 2022 World Games held in Birmingham, United States from 7 to 17 July 2022. Athletes representing Singapore won one silver medal and two bronze medals. The country finished in 57th place in the medal table.

Medalists

Invitational sports

Competitors
The following is the list of number of competitors in the Games:

Bowling

Singapore competed in bowling.

Canoe polo

Singapore competed in canoe polo.

Cue sports

Singapore competed in cue sports. Aloysius Yapp won the bronze medal in nine-ball pool.

Ju-jitsu

Singapore competed in ju-jitsu.

Wushu

Singapore won two medals in wushu.

References

Nations at the 2022 World Games
World Games
World Games